Tornos erectarius is a species of geometrid moth in the family Geometridae. It is found in Central America and North America.

The MONA or Hodges number for Tornos erectarius is 6484.

Subspecies
These two subspecies belong to the species Tornos erectarius:
 Tornos erectarius erectarius
 Tornos erectarius fieldi Grossbeck, 1912

References

Further reading

 
 

Boarmiini
Articles created by Qbugbot
Moths described in 1909